Tommy Gallarda (born May 5, 1988) is an American football tight end who is currently a free agent. He signed with the Jacksonville Jaguars as an undrafted free agent in 2011. He played tight end at Boise State.

Early years
He was a three-year letterman in football, track and field at Brea Olinda High School. He was selected to the All-Century League team twice both on offense and defense. He was also the Century League Defensive MVP.

College career
Gallarda committed to Boise State on January 4, 2006 during a home visit from Chris Petersen and Bryan Harsin. Petersen had asked Gallarda "Is there any way to get you to commit tonight?", Gallarda jokingly responded "If Vince Young scores the game-winning touchdown."  Young scored the eventual game-winning touchdown on an eight-yard run with 19 seconds left in the game to give the University of Texas a one-point lead over USC which they held to win the 2006 Rose Bowl.  Gallarda signed his letter of intent to play with Boise State on February 1, 2006.

In his freshman year, he played in 3 games, he recorded 3 receptions for 19 yards as a backup tight end.

In his sophomore year, he played 13 games in which he had 6 receptions, 65 receiving yards and 2 receiving touchdowns.

In his junior year, he played 14 games and started 12 games in which he recorded 9 receptions for 110 yards and 4 receiving touchdowns. On October 14, 2009, in a regular season game against Tulsa in which he recorded 3 receptions for 15 yards and a touchdown.

In his senior year, he recorded 7 receptions, 63 receiving yards and 3 receiving touchdowns. On September 6, 2010, in a regular season game against No. 13 ranked Virginia Tech in which Gallarda had 2 receptions for 4 yards and a touchdown as Boise State wins 33-30. On September 25, 2010, he had a 6-yard receiving touchdown against No. 24 Oregon State as Boise State wins 37-24.

Professional career

Jacksonville Jaguars
On July 26, 2011, he signed with the Jacksonville Jaguars as an undrafted free agent. On September 2, 2011, he was released.

Atlanta Falcons
He signed with the Atlanta Falcons to join the practice squad. On November 29, 2011, he was released from the practice squad. On January 10, 2012, he was signed to reserve/future contract. On September 1, 2012, he made the 53-man roster. On August 4, 2013, Gallarda was waived with an injury settlement.

External links
 Boise State Broncos bio
 Atlanta Falcons bio

References

1988 births
Living people
People from Brea, California
Players of American football from California
Sportspeople from Orange County, California
American football tight ends
Boise State Broncos football players
Jacksonville Jaguars players
Atlanta Falcons players